Nowa Róża  is a village in the administrative district of Gmina Nowy Tomyśl, within Nowy Tomyśl County, Greater Poland Voivodeship, in west-central Poland.

The village has a population of 137.

References

Villages in Nowy Tomyśl County